theStart (stylized as theSTART) is an American rock band from Los Angeles, California.

History
Aimee Echo and Jamie Miller formed the band in 1998, originally named Hero. They changed it to theStart on October 31, 1999, because "Hero" was already being used by many other bands. Their starting lineup included Echo on vocals, Miller on bass and synths, Scott Ellis (who played with Echo in Human Waste Project) on drums and Mike Smith on guitars. When Smith left the band in October 2000 to pursue other musical interests, Jamie switched over from bass to guitars, and Jeff Jaeger was hired as the band's new bassist. Their debut album, Shakedown!, was released in July 2001 through The Label Records, a record label imprint of The Firm, Inc., with distribution from Geffen Records.

Following a period of touring, they discovered that their record label was closing. The band decided to fund their next EP themselves, releasing The 1234 in April 2002 and selling it at their shows. Shortly thereafter, they announced the departure of Scott Ellis. While spending the summer touring with Scarling., they found a distributor in Small Stone Records for a self-titled EP.

Jaeger left the group some time after Ellis did. Over the next year, the group found replacements, bringing in Erick Sanger and Billy Brimblecon Jr. With their new lineup, the group was signed to Nitro Records in October 2003, which re-released their self-titled EP as Death Via Satellite. Over the next year they recorded a new album, and Initiation was released on August 24, 2004.

Brimblecon left the group shortly before the release of Initiation, and the album's supporting tour featured a number of interim drummers, including Adrian Young (of No Doubt) and Frank Zummo. Chelsea Davis was later selected as a permanent replacement. Later, in 2006, Sanger was let go from the group, replaced by Lance Webber. The group changed labels in 2007, moving from Nitro to their current label, Metropolis Records. Later that year, they released Ciao, Baby. After Lance Webber returned to college in 2009, Aimee, Jamie and Chelsea started a side project called Normandie, and toured as a trio.  

In 2017, the band released a 7-inch single for "Yvonne DeCarlo" and "Magic Number".

Band members

Current members
Aimee Echo – lead vocals (1998–present)
Jamie Miller – synth, backing vocals (1998–present), bass (1998–2000), guitar (2000–present)

Former members
Mike Smith – guitar (1998–2000)
Jeff Jaeger – bass, backing vocals (2000–2002)
Erick Sanger – bass, backing vocals (2003–2006)
Scott Ellis – drums (1998–2002)
Billy Brimblecom Jr. – drums (2003–2004, 2019–2020)
Chelsea Davis – drums (2007–2012)
Touring members

 Adrian Young – drums (2004, 2006)
 Frank Zummo – drums (2004–2006)
 Lance Webber – bass (2006–2009)
??? – bass (2019–2020)

Timeline

Discography
Studio albums

EPs

Singles

Music videos

References

External links

theSTART on Last.fm
theStart at Metropolis Records

Alternative rock groups from California
Metropolis Records artists
Musical groups established in 1998